Rumble is an unincorporated community in Logan Township, Pike County, in the U.S. state of Indiana.

History
A post office was established at Rumble in 1888, and remained in operation until it was discontinued in 1902. Eli F. Rumble served as an early postmaster.

Geography

References

Unincorporated communities in Pike County, Indiana
Unincorporated communities in Indiana